Larchwood is a city in Lyon County, Iowa, United States. The population was 926 at the time of the 2020 census.

History
Larchwood was founded circa 1872 by a group of McLean County, Illinois land developers: Jesse W. Fell (10 November 1808 – 25 February 1887) and Charles W. Holder (25 September 1819 – 10 April 1900). Fell was born in Pennsylvania, had settled in Bloomington, Illinois, in 1831 and had played an active role in founding many Illinois towns, including Clinton, Normal, Pontiac, and Towanda. He was a close friend of Abraham Lincoln, and with his brother Kersey Fell had persuaded Lincoln to write his famous autography. He was nationally known for his love of trees. Holder was a partner in many of Fell's projects, including Towanda and Normal. Holder, Illinois was named in his honor. Fell wrote, “I have never beheld such a large body of surpassingly beautiful prairie as is here to be found. There is absolutely no waste of land, and scarce a quarter of a section not affording an admirable building site.” Holder then entered the land. Larchwood was established at the center of their holdings. Fell frequently visited the site and in May 1873 and personally supervised the planting of some 100,000 saplings and tree cuttings. The town did not grow as rapidly as expected, and in 1881 the development was sold to an Englishman, Richard Sykes.

Geography
Larchwood's latitude and longitude coordinates in decimal form are 43.454351, -96.434897 respectively. It is the northwesternmost community in Iowa and the most distant from the capitol, Des Moines.

Demographics

2010 census
As of the census of 2010, there were 866 people, 353 households, and 257 families residing in the city. The racial makeup of the city was 98.6% White, 0.1% Native American, 0.2% Asian, 0.5% from other races, and 0.6% from two or more races. Hispanic or Latino of any race were 1.2% of the population.

There were 353 households, of which 36.5% had children under the age of 18 living with them, 59.2% were married couples living together, 9.9% had a female householder with no husband present, 3.7% had a male householder with no wife present, and 27.2% were non-families. 25.5% of all households were made up of individuals, and 12.5% had someone living alone who was 65 years of age or older. The average household size was 2.45 and the average family size was 2.94.

The median age in the city was 34.8 years. 28.3% of residents were under the age of 18; 5.5% were between the ages of 18 and 24; 27.8% were from 25 to 44; 23.1% were from 45 to 64; and 15.2% were 65 years of age or older. The gender makeup of the city was 48.4% male and 51.6% female.

2000 census
As of the census of 2000, there were 788 people, 326 households, and 234 families residing in the city. The racial makeup of the city was 98.60% White, 0.13% Native American, 0.51% Asian, and 0.76% from two or more races.

There were 326 households, out of which 33.7% had children under the age of 18 living with them, 62.6% were married couples living together, 5.8% had a female householder with no husband present, and 28.2% were non-families. 26.4% of all households were made up of individuals, and 15.3% had someone living alone who was 65 years of age or older. The average household size was 2.41 and the average family size was 2.91.

In the city, the population was spread out, with 24.2% under the age of 18, 10.0% from 18 to 24, 26.5% from 25 to 44, 20.6% from 45 to 64, and 18.7% who were 65 years of age or older. The median age was 38 years. For every 100 females, there were 95.0 males. For every 100 females age 18 and over, there were 92.6 males.

The median income for a household in the city was $42,250, and the median income for a family was $48,125. Males had a median income of $30,938 versus $21,164 for females. The per capita income for the city was $21,092. About 0.8% of families and 2.0% of the population were below the poverty line, including 0.5% of those under age 18 and 8.6% of those age 65 or over.

Education
Larchwood belongs to the West Lyon Community School District, which also serves students from the nearby towns of Lester, Alvord, and Inwood, as well as the many rural children from farming families.

Casino
The Grand Falls Casino Resort is located along the South Dakota border, northwest of Larchwood.
The casino opened for business June 9, 2011. The casino resort was developed by Kehl Management Company. Along with the casino there is a 97-room hotel. An 18-hole golf course is expected to be completed in the summer of 2014.

Notable people

Ellis Yarnal Berry, 10-term  U.S. Congressman from South Dakota, 1951 to 1971.
Cheri Blauwet (1980– ) Paralympic athlete
Kyle Vanden Bosch (1978– ) defensive end for the Detroit Lions
LeVar Woods, professional football player

References

External links

 
City-Data Comprehensive statistical data and more about Larchwood

Cities in Iowa
Cities in Lyon County, Iowa